Richard Gerald Puig (born March 16, 1953 in Tampa, Florida) is a former Major League Baseball player. He was selected fourteenth overall in the 1971 Major League Baseball Draft by the Mets, one spot ahead of future Hall of Famer Jim Rice.

Puig was attending Hillsborough High School in Tampa, Florida when he was drafted. Upon graduation, he joined their Appalachian League affiliate in Marion, Virginia, where he batted .217 with three home runs and thirteen runs batted in. Though he was drafted primarily for his glove, he displayed sloppy defense, committing seventeen errors.

In eleven plate appearances, he drew one walk. He also committed one error on the field.

He began the  season with the Mets' triple A affiliate, the Tidewater Tides, but was released mid-season with a .182 batting average, no home runs, and three RBIs. He caught on with the Chicago White Sox shortly afterwards, and remained in their organization through  before retiring.

References

External links

Rich Puig at Ultimate Mets Database

1953 births
Living people
New York Mets players
Major League Baseball second basemen
Baseball players from Tampa, Florida
Marion Mets players
Pompano Beach Mets players
Memphis Blues players
Visalia Mets players
Victoria Toros players
Tidewater Tides players
Knoxville Sox players